Pony Pals is a 44-book series of pony books written by Jeanne Betancourt and published by Scholastic. It chronicles the adventures of three young girls and their ponies.

The main characters of the series are Lucinda (Lulu) Sanders, Anna Harley, and Pam Crandal. The series starts when Lulu moves to the fictional town of Wiggins, and finds a neglected pony named Snow White, who she boards and later owns (after the fourth book). In the first book she becomes friends with Anna and Pam, who have lived in Wiggins all their lives and already have ponies, named Acorn and Lightning. The three girls call themselves the Pony Pals. The books in the series tend to have the girls find a Pony Pals Problem which they solve together, after each girl writes down a suggestion for the problem and they come up with a solution together at a Pony Pals meeting.

In 2010, a virtual world based on these books, clubponypals.com, was created, where users may adopt a virtual pony.

List of characters

Pony Pals

Lulu Sanders A brunette girl who moved to Wiggins at the start of the series. Her father travels the world researching animals, and her mother died when she was little. Lulu lives with her grandmother, a hairdresser who doesn't like horses. Lulu learned to ride when she lived in England, and also inherited a love of nature and adventure from her father.
Pam Crandal An African-American girl who has grown up around horses and ponies. Her father is a veterinarian and her mother is a riding teacher. Pam knows the most about horses and riding, as well as taking care of other animals. She originally disliked horse shows, despite being a highly capable rider, but over the course of the series she grows to like competitions.
Anna Harley A girl with curly blonde hair who has dyslexia but is an excellent artist. Her father is a firefighter and her mother owns a diner where the Pony Pals often eat and hold meetings. Anna is very clever and is kind, often encouraging the other Pony Pals to help someone. She is also the only Pony Pal that knows how to carriage drive.

Ponies

Snow White Lulu's pony; a white Welsh pony. Snow White is a beautiful and gentle pony who used to belong to a snobby girl named Rema Baxter. After Lulu saved Snow White from a barbed wire fence, she leased the pony and, later, convinced Rema to sell Snow White to her.
Lightning Pam's pony; a chestnut Connemara pony with a lucky white upside-down heart on her forehead. She is shown to be an excellent jumper, and also protective over other animals, but gets jealous when Pam spends too much time with other ponies.
Acorn Anna's pony; a bay (brown and black) Shetland pony. He is most well known for being cute and mischievous. He originally would not jump for Anna, but, the two of them learned to work together since then. He is very gentle with children, particularly the Junior Pony Pals, Mimi Kline and Rosalie Lacey.

Recurring characters

Mrs. Crandal Pam's mother. She runs the local riding school.
Dr. Crandall Pam's father, the local veterinarian.
Grandmother Sanders Lulu's grandmother, a hairdresser.
Mrs. Harley Anna's mother. She runs the only diner in town.
Ms. Wiggins A good friend of the Pony Pals. She owns a large area of land near Wiggins and gives the girls permission to ride on the trails on her land.

In other works 
A defaced version of Betancourt's novel Detective Pony was featured in the webcomic Homestuck, as a gift given to one of the characters. This inspired an extended fan-edit of the book, which featured extensive re-writing of the story and the inclusion of Betancourt as a self-aware character.

List of books

Regular series

I Want a Pony – 1995
A Pony for Keeps – 1995
A Pony in Trouble – 1995
Give Me Back my Pony – 1995
Pony to the Rescue – 1995
Too Many Ponies – 1995
Runaway Pony – 1995
Good-Bye Pony – 1996
The Wild Pony – 1996
Don't Hurt My Pony – 1996
Circus Pony – 1996
Keep Out, Pony! – 1996
The Girl Who Hated Ponies – 1997
Pony-Sitters – 1997
The Blind Pony – 1997
The Missing Pony Pal – 1997
Detective Pony – 1997
The Saddest Pony – 1997
Moving Pony – 1999
Stolen Ponies – 1999
The Winning Pony – 1999
Western Pony — 1999
The Pony and the Bear – 1999
Unlucky Pony – 2000
The Lonely Pony – 2000
Movie Star Pony – 2000
The Pony and the Missing Dog – 2000
The Newborn Pony – 2000
Lost and Found Pony – 2001
Pony-4-Sale – 2001
Ponies from the Past – 2001
He's My Pony! – 2001
What's Wrong with My Pony? – 2001
The Pony and the Lost Swan – 2002
Magic Pony – 2002
The Pony and the Haunted Barn – 2002
No Ponies in the House! – 2003
Ponies in Parade – 2003

Super Specials

The Baby Pony – 1996
The Story of Our Ponies – 1997
The Ghost Pony – 1997
The Fourth Pony Pal – 2002
Pony Problem – 2003
The Last Pony Ride – 2004

References

External links
Club Pony Pals

Series of children's books
Pony books